John Monahan may refer to:

 John Monahan (scientist), Irish-born biochemist and CEO
 John Monahan (law professor), professor at the University of Virginia Law School
 John Monahan (RAF officer), English-born Royal Air Force officer
 F. John Monahan (born 1943), American politician in Massachusetts
 John P. Monahan (born 1932), United States Marine Corps general

See also
 John Moynihan (died 2002), American sports broadcaster